Karen Anderson (born 22 January 1971, in Kingston) is a professional female squash player who represented Jamaica during her career. She reached a career-high world ranking of World No. 94 in December 2005 after having joined the Women's International Squash Players Association in the same year.

Career, rankings, championships and trophies
1981: National and Caribbean Junior Representative
1986: National U17 Junior Champion 
1987: National Ladies Champion and National U19 Girls Champion
National Senior Team Representative at Caribbean Championships
1988: Runner-up National Ladies Champion
National U19 Girls Champion
1989: National Ladies Champion
National U19 Girls Champion
Caribbean U19 Girls Champion
1990-1995: National Senior Team Representative at Caribbean Championships
1999: PanAm Games Winnipeg Team Member
2000-2001: Milex Liguanea Open Champion
2000-2003: National Ladies Champion
2001: Ranked #3 in Caribbean
2002: Commonwealth Games Manchester, England Team Member
Plate Competition Runner-up
2002: CAC Games El Salvador - Silver Medalist Team Competition
CAC Games El Salvador - Bronze Medalist Mixed Doubles
2002: Started coaching part-time
2003: PanAm Games Dominican Republic team member
2003: Coaching full-time
2004: Coaching Certification Technical Component
2004: 3rd Place Trident Barbados Open
2004: Coached Jamaica's Junior Elite Squad
2005: Caribbee/Playfair Barbados Open Champion
2005: Attained B2 Referee Certification (Squash Canada)
2005: St. Lucia Open Runner-Up
2005-2009: National Ladies Champion
2005: Ranked #3 in Caribbean
2005: Ranked #95 in the World
2006: Silver Medallist Ladies Doubles CAC Games
Bronze Medallist Ladies Singles CAC Games
2006: Named National Junior Coach for Junior Caribbean Squash Championships
2006: Refereed at the Women's World Team Championships
2007: Caribbean Ladies Champion
2007: Retired from competitive play after the Caribbean Championships
2007–present: National Junior Coach
2010: Selected as referee for the Commonwealth Games 2010

External links
 

1971 births
Living people
Jamaican female squash players
Sportspeople from Kingston, Jamaica